Paul O'Neill is an Australian Paralympic cyclist.  At the 2000 Sydney Games, he won a silver medal  in the Mixed Bicycle Road Race LC1 event and two bronze medals in the Mixed 1 km Time Trial LC1 and the Mixed Individual Pursuit LC1.

References

Paralympic cyclists of Australia
Cyclists at the 2000 Summer Paralympics
Medalists at the 2000 Summer Paralympics
Paralympic silver medalists for Australia
Paralympic bronze medalists for Australia
Year of birth missing (living people)
Living people
Australian male cyclists
Paralympic medalists in cycling